Adimeh or Al-'Adimah  is a Syrian village located in Baniyas District, Tartus.  According to the Syria Central Bureau of Statistics (CBS), Adimeh had a population of 1,408 in the 2004 census.

Near Adimeh, there is a Crusader castle called Burj al-Sabi.

References 

Populated places in Baniyas District